Cochylichroa hospes, the banded sunflower moth, is a moth of the  family Tortricidae. It is found from North Carolina to Colorado, Utah, New Mexico and northern Arizona.

The length of the forewings is 5.5–8 mm. Adults are golden ochreous with broad, dark brown to rust brown medial fascia and a subapical blotch containing iridescent grey patches. Adults are on wing from July to August.

The larvae feed on developing seeds in flower heads of Helianthus species. The species overwinters as a last instar larva.

Cochylichroa hospes was formerly a member of the genus Cochylis, but was moved to the redefined genus Cochylichroa in 2019 as a result of phylogenetic analysis.

Gallery

References

Tortricinae
Moths described in 1884